Sind or Sindh can refer to:

Sindh, a province of Pakistan established in 1970, renamed from Sind province in 1990
Sind Province (1936–1955), of British India 1936−1947 and West Pakistan 1947−1955
Sind Division, of the Bombay Presidency province of British India, 1843–1936
Sindh River, Madhya Pradesh and Uttar Pradesh in India
Sind Valley (Kashmir)
Sind sparrow, a bird species and the unofficial provincial bird of Sindh
Sind bat, a bat species
Sind woodpecker, a bird species
PNS Sind, a ship of the Pakistan Navy
HMIS Sind (K274), a ship of the Royal Indian Navy
Arab Sind, a administrative region of Sind during the Abbasid Caliphate and Umayyad Caliphate

See also
Sindhi (disambiguation)
Sindhu (disambiguation)
Districts of Pakistan#Sindh
History of Sindh
Scinde Dawk, defunct postal system of Sindh
Scinde Medal, British East India Company award for the British conquest of Sindh
Scinde Railway, former railway in Sindh
Scinde, Punjab & Delhi Railway, former railway in British India
Scinde Camel Corps, of the British Indian Army
14th Horse (Scinde Horse), armoured corps of the Indian Army